Pavle Delibašić (born 30 November 1978) is a retired Serbian footballer.

He had previously played for Spartak Subotica, Bosnian FK Leotar, FK Čukarički, Chinese Chongqing Lifan and Greek Kallithea F.C., back in Serbia with FK Zemun and with Bulgarian Minyor Pernik and FK Banat Zrenjanin.

Career
He was born in Kosovska Mitrovica, SR Serbia, SFR Yugoslavia. In season 1995/96 as 17-year-old Delibašić played for the junior team of Red Star Belgrade, but he never played for the first team. In 2003 Delibašić played with FK Leotar in the Champions League qualifying rounds after winning the 2002–03 Premier League of Bosnia and Herzegovina. In July 2003 he scored a goal in the 2nd qualifying round in a match against Slavia Praha, but the result of the match was a 1:2 loss for Leotar. The forward played 26 matches in 2003–04 and scored 11 goals. In summer 2004 he returned to Serbia and signed with FK Čukarički. One year later gone in Chinese Chongqing Lifan. In season 2007/08 Delibašić played for Greek Kallithea F.C.

Delibašić signed a 2-year deal with Lokomotiv Plovdiv after being released from Kallithea in 2008. He was given the №9 shirt. Delibašić made his official debut for Lokomotiv in a match against Slavia Sofia on 27 September 2008. He played for 33 minutes. The result of the match was a 0:2 loss for Loko.

On 2 October 2008 he scored his first goals for Lokomotiv Plovdiv against Lokomotiv Sofia. He scored two goals in the 32nd and 34th minute. The result of the match was a 3:2 win for Loko.

Honours
Club
Leotar
First League of the Republika Srpska: 2001–02

Personal
First League of the Republika Srpska top-scorer: 2001–02 (21 goals)

References

 Profile at Srbijafudbal.
  Lokomotiv Plovdiv profile

1978 births
Living people
Serbian footballers
Serbian expatriate footballers
FK Radnički 1923 players
FK Jedinstvo Ub players
FK Budućnost Banatski Dvor players
FK Spartak Subotica players
FK Leotar players
FK Banat Zrenjanin players
FK Čukarički players
Serbian SuperLiga players
PFC Lokomotiv Plovdiv players
Chinese Super League players
Chongqing Liangjiang Athletic F.C. players
Kallithea F.C. players
FK Zemun players
PFC Minyor Pernik players
FK Bežanija players
FK Novi Pazar players
KF Teuta Durrës players
OFK Žarkovo players
FK Napredak Kruševac players
Expatriate footballers in Greece
Expatriate footballers in China
Expatriate footballers in Bulgaria
Expatriate footballers in Albania
Expatriate footballers in Bosnia and Herzegovina
First Professional Football League (Bulgaria) players
Association football forwards
Serbian expatriate sportspeople in Bulgaria
Serbian expatriate sportspeople in China
Serbian expatriate sportspeople in Greece
Serbian expatriate sportspeople in Albania
Serbian expatriate sportspeople in Bosnia and Herzegovina
Premier League of Bosnia and Herzegovina players